Poljče is a small settlement in the Municipality of Braslovče in northern Slovenia. It lies on the flatlands on the right bank of the Savinja River south of Parižlje. The area is part of the traditional region of Styria. The municipality is now included in the Savinja Statistical Region.

References

External links
Poljče on Geopedia

Populated places in the Municipality of Braslovče